Host is one of many unincorporated communities that dot the agriculture-covered landscape of Berks County, Pennsylvania, United States. The village is located in southeastern Tulpehocken Township, along Pennsylvania Route 419.

Education

Children in the community attend the Tulpehocken Area School District, whose high school is located in nearby Jefferson Township.

Unincorporated communities in Berks County, Pennsylvania
Unincorporated communities in Pennsylvania